Namsai district is an administrative district in the state of Arunachal Pradesh in north-east India.It was carved out of Lohit district in November 2014.

History
The creation of Namsai district was approved by the Arunachal Pradesh government of Nabam Tuki on 21 March 2013.

On 25 November 2014, the Namsai subdivision of Lohit district was declared to be a new district of Arunachal Pradesh, the 18th district of the state.

Demographics

Religion

References

External links
 Official website

 
Districts of Arunachal Pradesh
2014 establishments in Arunachal Pradesh